Moayed-ol Mamalek Fekri Ershad (1869–1916) was an Iranian journalist and playwright. He was born in Tehran and studied in Dar ul-Funun. In the time of constitutional movement in Iran he was a supporter of this movement and when the Persian Constitutional Revolution happened, he was 37. In this time he was the editor of Sobhe Sadegh, a political and revolutionary newspaper. He was arrested in 1908 after the coup d'état of Mohammad Ali Shah Qajar. He was also a playwright and wrote several plays in which he criticized politicians of his time.

Some of his plays 
 Old Statesmen, New Statesmen
 The Story of a Journalist
 Love in the Old Age

References

1869 births
1916 deaths
People from Tehran
Iranian journalists
People of Qajar Iran
19th-century Iranian people
20th-century Iranian people
Iranian dramatists and playwrights
People of the Persian Constitutional Revolution